I Even Met Happy Gypsies is a 1967 Yugoslav film by Serbian director Aleksandar Petrović. Its original Serbian title is Skupljači perja, which means The Feather Gatherers. The film is centered on Romani people's life in a village in northern Vojvodina, but it also deals with subtler themes such as love, ethnic and social relationships. Beside Bekim Fehmiu, Olivera Vučo, Bata Živojinović and Mija Aleksić, film features a cast of Romani actors speaking the Romani language. I Even Met Happy Gypsies is considered one of the best films of the Black Wave in Yugoslav cinema.

Plot
The protagonist, Beli Bora Perjar (Bekim Fehmiu), is a charming but mean-spirited gypsy, while his former affair, the kafana singer Lenče (Olivera Vučo), is submissive. Bora is in love with the younger Tisa (Gordana Jovanović), who is being offered in marriage by her step-father. The two get themselves in trouble and eventually have to flee. Tisa rejects her husband and she and Bora get married in the church. Tisa tries to get to Belgrade, while Bora stabs a man in a knife fight. They are both, therefore, exiled from their Romani camp, yet their adventures continue.

Cast 
 Bekim Fehmiu as Beli Bora Perjar
 Olivera Vučo as Lenče
 Bata Živojinović as Mirta
 Gordana Jovanović as Tisa
 Mija Aleksić as Pavle
Rest of cast listed alphabetically:
 Severin Bijelić as Bigoted man
 Stojan Dečermić as Hladnjača driver 1
 Milivoje Đorđević as Sandor
 Rahela Ferari as Igumanija
 Etelka Filipovski as Bora's wife
 Milorad Jovanović as Toni
 Zoran Longinović as Islednik 1
 Branislav-Ciga Milenković
 Božidar Pavičević-Longa as Hladnjača driver 2
 Velizar Petrović
 Djordje Pura as Islednik 2
 Nina Sajin
 Milivoje Tomić as Romanian
 Janez Vrhovec as judge

Reception
The film was the most popular film in Belgrade for the year with 400,000 admissions, compared to an average of 60,000.

Awards 
At the 1967 Cannes Film Festival it was nominated for the Palme d'Or and won the Special Grand Prize of the Jury and the FIPRESCI Prize.

The film was nominated for the 1967 Academy Award for Best Foreign Language Film (event in April 1968) and for the Golden Globe Award for Best Foreign Language Film. Bata Živojinović also won a Golden Arena award for Best Actor at the 1967 Pula Film Festival for his portrayal of Mirta.

See also 
 List of submissions to the 40th Academy Awards for Best Foreign Language Film
 List of Yugoslav submissions for the Academy Award for Best Foreign Language Film

References

External links 

1967 films
Films directed by Aleksandar Petrović
Serbo-Croatian-language films
Serbian drama films
Avala Film films
Films set in Vojvodina
Yugoslav drama films
Films set in Yugoslavia
Romani-language films
Films shot in Serbia
Films set in Belgrade
Cannes Grand Prix winners
Films about Romani people